The shortfin mako shark (Isurus oxyrinchus), also known as the blue pointer or bonito shark, is a large mackerel shark. It is commonly referred to as the mako shark, as is the longfin mako shark (Isurus paucus). The species is classified as Endangered by the IUCN.

Etymology
"Mako" comes from the Māori language, meaning either the shark or a shark tooth. Following the Māori language, "mako" in English is both singular and plural.  The word may have originated in a dialectal variation, as it is similar to the common words for shark in a number of Polynesian languages—makō in the Kāi Tahu Māori dialect, mangō in other Māori dialects, "mago" in Samoan, ma'o in Tahitian, and mano in Hawaiian. The first written usage is in Lee and Kendall's Grammar and vocabulary of the language of New Zealand (1820), which simply states, "Máko; A certain fish". Richard Taylor's A leaf from the natural history of New Zealand (1848) is more elaborate: "Mako, the shark which has the tooth so highly prized by the Maoris".
In 1809, Constantine Rafinesque gave the shortfin mako the scientific name Isurus oxyrinchus (isurus means "the same tail", oxyrinchus means "pointy snout").

Description

The shortfin mako shark is a fairly large species of shark. Growth rates appear to be somewhat accelerated in comparison to other species in the lamnid family. The species is sexually dimorphic, with females typically larger than males. Yet another fish was caught off Marmaris, Turkey in the late 1950s at an estimated size of between  making it the largest known specimen of the species. However, this estimate was created using photos of the shark and not at the time of capture so this estimate must be taken with reasonable caution. The authors did not estimate a weight for this specimen.

The shortfin mako shark is cylindrical in shape, with a vertically elongated tail. This species exhibits countershading, with brilliant metallic blue coloration dorsally and white ventrally. The line of demarcation between blue and white on the body is distinct. The underside of the snout and the area around the mouth are white. Larger specimens tend to possess darker coloration that extends onto parts of the body that would be white in smaller individuals. The juvenile mako differs in that it has a clear blackish stain on the tip of the snout. The longfin mako shark very much resembles the shortfin mako shark, but has larger pectoral fins, dark rather than pale coloration around the mouth and larger eyes. The presence of only one lateral keel on the tail and the lack of lateral cusps on the teeth distinguish the mako from the closely related porbeagle sharks of the genus Lamna.

Ecology

Range and habitat

The shortfin mako inhabits offshore temperate and tropical seas worldwide. The closely related longfin mako shark is found in the Gulf Stream or warmer offshore waters (e.g. New Zealand and Maine).

In the western Atlantic, it can be found from Argentina and the Gulf of Mexico to Browns Bank off of Nova Scotia. In Canadian waters, these sharks are neither abundant nor rare. Swordfish are good indicators of shortfin mako populations, as the former are a source of food and prefer similar environmental conditions.

Shortfin mako sharks travel long distances to seek prey or mates. Another specimen swam  in 37 days, averaging  a day.

Feeding

The shortfin mako shark feeds mainly upon cephalopods and bony fish including mackerels, tunas, bonitos, and swordfish, but it may also eat other sharks, porpoises, sea turtles, and seabirds. They hunt by lunging vertically up and tearing off chunks of their preys' flanks and fins. Mako swim below their prey, so they can see what is above and have a high probability of reaching prey before it notices them. In Ganzirri and Isola Lipari, Sicily, shortfin mako have been found with amputated swordfish bills impaled into their head and gills, suggesting swordfish seriously injure and likely kill them. In addition, this location, and the late spring and early summer timing, corresponding to the swordfish's spawning cycle, suggests they hunt while the swordfish are most vulnerable, typical of many predators.

Shortfin mako sharks consume 3% of their weight each day and take about 1.5–2.0 days to digest an average-sized meal. By comparison, the sandbar shark, an inactive species, consumes 0.6% of its weight a day and takes 3 to 4 days to digest it. An analysis of the stomach contents of 399 male and female mako sharks ranging from  suggest mako from Cape Hatteras to the Grand Banks prefer bluefish, constituting 77.5% of their diet by volume. The average capacity of the stomach was 10% of the total weight. Shortfin mako sharks consumed 4.3% to 14.5% of the available bluefish between Cape Hatteras and Georges Bank.

Shortfin mako sharks over  have interior teeth considerably wider and flatter than smaller mako, which enables them to prey effectively upon dolphins, swordfish, and other sharks. An amateur videotape, taken in Pacific waters, shows a moribund pantropical spotted dolphin whose tail was almost completely severed being circled by a shortfin mako. Mako also tend to scavenge long-lined and netted fish.

The bite of a shortfin mako shark is exceptionally strong; the current record for the strongest bite measured for any shark belongs to a shortfin mako that was recorded at Mayor Island in New Zealand in 2020. The shark had been coaxed into biting a custom-made "bite meter" as part of an experiment to measure mako bite force. The strongest bite recorded during the experiment was roughly 3,000 lbs. of force, or roughly 13,000 newtons.

Its endothermic constitution partly accounts for its relatively great speed.

Like other lamnid sharks, the shortfin mako shark has a heat-exchange circulatory system that allows the shark to be  warmer than the surrounding water. This system enables them to maintain a stable, very high level of activity, giving it an advantage over its cold-blooded prey.

Behavior
The shortfin mako is a fast species that can leap into the air when hooked, making it a highly sought-after game fish worldwide. Some cases of shortfin mako jumping into a boat after having been hooked have been reported.

Reproduction
The shortfin mako shark is a yolk-sac ovoviviparous shark giving birth to live young. Developing embryos feed on unfertilized eggs (oophagy) within the uterus during the 15- to 18-month gestation period. They do not engage in sibling cannibalism unlike the sand tiger shark (Carcharias taurus). Females may rest for 18 months after birth before mating again. Shortfin mako sharks bear young on average every three years.
A common mating strategy of shortfin mako sharks has been documented as using multiple paternity as a mating strategy, known as polyandry. Polyandry is where the females mate with more than one male. This strategy is used to have a single brood sired by multiple males (multiple paternity) and is a common strategy in diverse taxa, including invertebrates and vertebrates.

Lifespan
Shortfin mako sharks, as with most other sharks, are aged by sectioning vertebrae – one of the few bony structures in sharks – and counting growth bands. The age of shortfin mako, and therefore important parameters, such as age at sexual maturity and longevity, were severely underestimated until 2006 (e.g. claims of sexual maturity at 4–6 years, claims of longevity as low as 11 years), because of a poorly supported belief that shortfin mako sharks deposited two growth bands per year in their vertebrae. This belief was overturned by a landmark study which proved that shortfin mako sharks only deposit one band in their vertebrae per year, as well as providing validated ages for numerous specimens. Natanson et al. (2006) aged 258 shortfin mako specimens and recorded:
 Maximum age of 29 years in males ( fork length (FL))
 Maximum age of 32 years in females ( FL)
 50% sexual maturity at 8 years in males ( FL)
 50% sexual maturity at 18 years in females ( FL)

Similar, validated age findings were made (median age at maturity in males 7–9 years, median age at maturity in females 19–21 years, longevity estimates 29 years and 28 years respectively) in New Zealand waters.

Due to this error, fishery management models and ecological risk assessment models in use around the world were underestimating both the longevity and the age at sexual maturity in shortfin mako sharks, particularly in females, by two-thirds or more (i.e. 6 years versus 18+ years), and some of these inaccurate models remain in use.

Intelligence
Of all studied sharks, the shortfin mako has one of the largest brain-to-body ratios. This large brain size prompted New Zealand Sealife Australia and New Zealand senior curator Craig Thorburn of Auckland, New Zealand, and film-maker Mike Bhana to investigate the intelligence of the shortfin mako. From tests involving shape differentiation to electroreception tests and individual recognition, Isuru Somawardana and his team of shark experts discovered shortfin mako are fast-learning sharks, able to determine whether or not the researchers were threatening. The sharks involved in the study (while never the same individuals) after initial caution showed unique and novel behaviors, such as refusing to roll back their eyes during feeding and allowing themselves to be briefly restrained and touched while being offered bait. Shortfin mako also do not rely on electroreception when hunting, unlike the great white shark, based on tests involving wired fiberglass fish designed to emit weak electrical signals resembling real fish of similar size. Instead, they rely on smell, hearing, and most prominently, vision. The results of this research were featured on a documentary presented by Shark Week in 1999 called Mako: Swift, Smart & Deadly.

Relationship with humans

Fishing for sport
Mako fishing is a prominent activity around the world.  As one of the fastest species in the water they offer acrobatic flips, fast runs, and heavy fights that entertain anglers.  Traditionally, the sharks are hooked through the use of chum and baitcasters; however, fly fishing for them has become more popular, particularly in San Diego, where one of the three known worldwide mako rookeries is located.  A cottage industry of fishing in this rookery has emerged, specifically catch and release with charter operations out of Mission Bay. For many years the mass commercial boats hunted them for restaurant catch, but through the efforts of many local fishing companies and national organizations such as Orvis, this has been curbed.

Captivity

Of all recorded attempts to keep pelagic shark species in captivity, the shortfin mako shark has fared the poorest, even more so than the oceanic whitetip shark, the blue shark, and the great white shark. At SeaWorld San Diego, a  shortfin mako shark ability test failed in the early 1970s. In the summer of 1978, two mako sharks caught off the coast of San Diego failed to evade the wall and both died within three days. The current record is held by a specimen kept at the New Jersey Aquarium for only five days in 2001. Like past attempts at keeping Isurus in captivity, the animal appeared strong on arrival, but had trouble negotiating the walls of the aquarium, refused to feed, quickly weakened, and died.

Attacks on humans
ISAF statistics records 9 shortfin attacks on humans between 1580 and 2022, three of which were fatal, along with 20 boat attacks. This mako is regularly blamed for attacks on humans and, due to its speed, power, and size, it is certainly capable of injuring and killing people. However, this species will not generally attack humans and does not seem to treat them as prey. Most modern attacks involving shortfin mako sharks are considered to have been provoked due to harassment or the shark being caught on a fishing line. Sharks can be attracted to spear fishermen carrying a stuck fish, and may slap them with cavitation bubbles from a swift tail flick. Divers who have encountered shortfin mako note, prior to an attack, they swim in a figure-eight pattern and approach with mouths open.

Conservation
The shortfin mako is currently classified as Endangered by the IUCN, having been uplisted from Vulnerable in 2019 and Near-Threatened in 2007. The species is included on Appendix II of CITES which regulates international trade. The species is being targeted by both sport and commercial fisheries, and there is a substantial proportion of bycatch in driftnet fisheries for other species. In June 2018, the New Zealand Department of Conservation classified the shortfin mako shark as "Not Threatened" with the qualifier "Uncertain whether Secure Overseas" under the New Zealand Threat Classification System. In 2019, the shortfin mako was reclassified by the IUCN from being listed as "Vulnerable" to "Endangered" after a review of 58 elasmobranch species.

See also

List of common commercial fish of Sri Lanka

References

External links

ARKive – images and movies of the shortfin mako (Isurus oxyrinchus)

Shark references.com: Isurus oxyrinchus

Fish described in 1810
Fish of Cuba
Fish of Israel
Fish of New Zealand
Fish of the Atlantic Ocean
Fish of the Dominican Republic
Fish of the Pacific Ocean
Isurus
Ovoviviparous fish
Species endangered by sport fishing and hunting
Species endangered by use as food
Taxa named by Constantine Samuel Rafinesque